The Tarime Goodwill Foundation (TGF) was started by Dr. Hudson Winani M.D. to address the unmet health needs of the Tarime District in the Mara Region of Tanzania. Most of the population of Tarime lives in rural areas where poverty is visible in many forms: lack of access to health care and education, malnutrition, and lack of access to transportation. Only 30–40% of children in the district have access to immunisations.

There are two hospitals in the district, serving a population of some 480,000 people. The government-run Bomani Hospital has five or six doctors, most of whom are trained in Dar es Salaam. The other hospital is the Tarime Goodwill Hospital, set up by Dr. Winani and operated by Dr. Harun o'Maitarya, six clinical officers and fifteen nurses and Magoto health centre

The mission of the Tarime Goodwill Foundation and its health services program is to provide comprehensive, curative, and preventive community-based medical health and education in Tarime District. The Tarime Goodwill Hospital has 38 beds, an out-patient and casualty department and two dispensaries. The TGF Health Services program treats 120,000 people each year. Malaria, upper respiratory infections, gastroenteritis and HIV/AIDS are the most prevalent health conditions being treated.

The Tarime Goodwill Foundation and its education services program sponsor more than fifteen students from Tarime district, most of them in secondary schools and others in university. TGF education service owns a secondary school in Tarime district.

TGF provides free service to orphans, poor families, disadvantaged individuals and groups, and HIV/AIDS patients. TGF receives assistance from the Peter Hewitt Care for Africa Foundation in Australia, Direct Relief  based in California U.S.A., and other international aid organisations.

References

Foundations based in Tanzania
Medical and health foundations
Medical and health organisations based in Tanzania